Robert Emmett Tyrrell Jr. (born December 14, 1943) is an American conservative magazine editor, book author and columnist. He is the founder and editor-in-chief of The American Spectator and writes with the byline "R. Emmett Tyrrell, Jr."

Background
Tyrrell was born in Chicago, Illinois, and raised Roman Catholic. In 1961, he graduated from Fenwick High School in Oak Park, Illinois.

He attended Indiana University, where he was on the swim team under the notable coach James "Doc" Counsilman. While at Indiana University, he was a member of Phi Kappa Psi, living in a chapter house where Steve Tesich resided. He also has a master's degree in American Diplomatic History.

Career

Arkansas Project

Tyrrell was one of those behind the Arkansas Project, financed by Richard Mellon Scaife, to improve the Spectator'''s investigative journalism. He detailed the project's purposes and accomplishments in his 2007 book The Clinton Crack-Up: The Boy President's Life after the White House.Arkansas Project Led to Turmoil and Rifts, The Washington Post, May 2, 1999

Forced sale

In 2000, government investigations of The American Spectator caused Tyrrell to sell the magazine to venture capitalist George Gilder. In 2003, Gilder, having a series of financial and legal setbacks, resold the magazine back to Tyrrell and the American Alternative Foundation, the organization under which the magazine was originally started, for a dollar. The magazine was initially called The Alternative.  The name of the owner was changed to the American Spectator Foundation. The magazine then moved operations back to the Washington, DC, area. Later that year, former book publisher Alfred S. Regnery became the magazine's publisher. By 2004, circulation hovered at around 50,000.

Media appearances

A noted political commentator, Tyrrell appeared on a 1984 episode of Firing Line (TV program) with William F. Buckley Jr., in which he debated with Christopher Hitchens the merits of the Feminist Movement. Tyrell declared the movement to be "a terrible failure," later mocking the notion of a woman's "career" and reaffirming his opinion that feminists are misanthropes.

 Criticisms of homosexuality 
In her 1994 article "Spectator Sport," New York Times contributor Dinitia Smith quoted Tyrrell, who spoke on a number of subjects at a dinner party attended by the journalist. Tyrrell stated that homosexuals are bringing about "an end to community" and that AIDS statistics are supported by "thousands of years of moral teaching suggesting homosexuality is wrong."

 Personal life 
In 1972, Tyrrell married first wife Judy Mathews, with whom he had three children; they divorced in 1988.  In 1998, Tyrrell married Jeanne M. Hauch at Holy Rosary Church, Washington, DC.

Tyrrell is a practicing Catholic. He obtained a canonical annulment of his first marriage before his present union.

He serves on the Board of Selectors for Jefferson Awards.

Tyrrell is the great-great-grandson of Patrick D. Tyrrell, an immigrant from Ireland and a detective in the United States Secret Service in the 1870s, involved in foiling the plot to steal the body of Abraham Lincoln in 1876.

Awards

 1975: Samuel S. Beard Award for Greatest Public Service by an Individual 35 Years or Under from the Jefferson Awards for Public Service 
 1978:  Ten Outstanding Young Men in America award in History. He now serves on the Board of Selectors for Jefferson Awards.

Works

Tyrrell has written for Time, the Wall Street Journal, the London Spectator, The Daily Telegraph, The Guardian, The New York Times, The Washington Post, and The Washington Times. He was also a media fellow at the Hoover Institution.

 Public Nuisances (1979)
 The Liberal Crack-Up (1984)
 Orthodoxy: The American Spectator's 20th Anniversary Anthology (1987)
  The Conservative Crack-Up (1992) 
 Boy Clinton: The Political Biography (1997) 
 The Impeachment of William Jefferson Clinton (1997)
 Madame Hillary: The Dark Road to the White House (2003)
 The Continuing Crisis: As Chronicled for Four Decades (2009)
 After the Hangover: The Conservatives Road to Recovery (2010)
 The Death of Liberalism'' (2011)

References

External links
 
 Tyrrell on Firing Line with William F. Buckley, Jr. and Christopher Hitchens

1943 births
Living people
Writers from Chicago
American male journalists
American magazine editors
American magazine founders
American political writers
American Roman Catholics
The American Spectator people
20th-century American non-fiction writers
21st-century American non-fiction writers
The Washington Times people
20th-century American male writers
21st-century American male writers